Barry L. Gan (born 1948) is an American academic. He is Professor Emeritus of Philosophy at St. Bonaventure University. From 1986 until 2020 he directed the Center for Nonviolence, formerly the  Peace  Studies program at St. Bonaventure University. For twenty-six years, from 1990 to 2016, he was editor of The Acorn: Journal of the Gandhi-King Society, now called The Acorn: Philosophical  Studies in Pacifism  and Nonviolence. For two years in the 1990s he served as program committee chair of the Fellowship of Reconciliation, the oldest and largest interfaith peace group in the United States, and also served from 2006 until 2009 as co-editor of Peace and Change, a quarterly journal of peace research.

Selected works

References

1948 births
Living people
University of Rochester alumni
St. Bonaventure University faculty
Nonviolence advocates